Cobubatha metaspilaris is a moth of the family Noctuidae, described by Francis Walker in 1863. It is found in the southern United States (from Florida to Texas), British Virgin Islands and Cuba.

The wingspan is about 14 mm.

References

Moths described in 1863
Acontiinae